Albert Monroe Sackett (June 24, 1920 – May 20, 2016) was a rear admiral in the United States Navy. He was a commandant of the Ninth Naval District, from June 1976 to August 1977.

References

External links
Profile of Albert M. Sackett

United States Navy admirals
1920 births
2016 deaths
People from Victor, Iowa
Military personnel from Iowa